Sir Shri Ram (also Lala Shri Ram; 27 April 1884 – 11 January 1963) was an Indian industrialist and philanthropist. He was the son of Rai Bahadur Ram Kishen Das Gurwale, the founder of the Delhi Cloth & General Mills, which remains one of the oldest firms in India today.

Early life
Sir Shri Ram was born on April 27, 1884. First son of Madan Mohan Lal and Chando Devi. He belonged to an Agarwal family of Haryana. Sir Shri Ram got most of his early education from a Municipal Primary School in Bazaar Sita Ram. He matriculated in March, 1900 and later got himself enrolled for the Intermediate Arts course at Hindu College.

Sir Shri Ram began as a humble worker and went on to set up one of India's largest business houses - the DCM Group. Born into a family of modest means, Shri Ram, in the 79 years of his life, built an industrial empire manufacturing a vast variety of goods like - textiles, sugar, chemicals, vanaspati, pottery, fans, sewing machines, electric motors and capacitors.

Sir Shri Ram, the man who made DCM a household name, entrusting the business to his two sons- Bharat Ram and Charat Ram. (His eldest son, Murli Dhar died in a plane crash near Karachi immediately after Independence in 1949. DCM used to run a textile mill at Lyallpur, which was under Murli Dhar's charge; he was on the flight from Lyallpur to Karachi to buy jewellery for his son Shri Dhar's wedding and perished in the accident along with his wife.)

Career
When Sir Shri Ram was born Delhi Cloth and General Mills was just a pipe-dream. His uncle, Lala Gopal Rai, had been playing with the idea of a textile mill for some time but he was only a munim - a kind of private secretary - working in a pedhi, though his family was fairly well-to-do, if not exactly affluent. Within a few years of Shri Ram's birth, however, things had started moving and the Lahore Tribune carried the brief news items in its issue of February 28, 1891, under the heading, "Local and Provincial"- The opening ceremony of Delhi Cloth and General Mills Co Ltd will take place on Monday 2 March at 3 pm.

The story of DCM is in essence the story of its secretaries. Later the work was taken over by the managing agents who virtually controlled and ran the company. Sir Shri Ram appears on the scene first in 1905 (at the age of 21 years) when he attended an Annual General Meeting along with his uncle (Lala Gopal Rai, Founder and First Secretary of Delhi Cloth and General Mills). The uncle died the same year and Shri Ram's father, Madan Mohan Lal, was appointed in his place.

Four years later in 1909, Sir Shri Ram was joined the company as an apprentice in the Accounts Department under Munim Ram Path; without a formal title but with sufficient authority to act on his father's behalf. He was then 25 years old. For another decade after that, he ran the company with his father, but the latter slowly faded out and Sir Shri Ram assumed full formal charge.
Sir Shri Ram had persuaded his father to enter into a big contract for the supply of tents for the British Army during First World War (1914–18) and they had earned a lot of money quickly. The father-and-son combine is said to have netted between Rs 3 lakh and Rs 5 lakh, a lot of money in those days, the bulk of which was used in buying DCM shares. The commissions they obtained on the tent deal were not given under the table. Under a three-way contract between themselves, the company and an agent, they were entitled to receive 20 per cent of profits from the deal while the company received 50 per cent. It was Sir Shri Ram's idea and he used the money to increase his holding in the company from less than 5 per cent to 16 per cent (and to 20 per cent by 1925).

In less than eight years after he gained control, Sir Shri Ram had raised the fixed capital, buildings and machinery, from Rs 11 lakh to Rs 43 lakh and pushed up sales more than fivefold, from Rs 16 lakh to Rs 91 lakh. Profits had gone up from Rs 3 lakh in 1921 to Rs 18 lakh in 1929.  Sir Shri Ram parlayed the DCM Ltd with an assets totaling Rs 55 crore by 1963, the year he passed away.

SIR SHRI RAM’S CONTRIBUTION IN NATION BUILDING:

Education:

As far back in 1920, Sir Shri Ram had decided to conduct the first experiment in vocation-oriented education by founding the Commercial Education Trust. The first school taken over by Commercial Education Trust was the Commercial High School. His Association with the Trust continued right up to the end of his life. The Commercial High School was raised in 1926 to the standard of an Intermediate College, in 1930 to a degree college and in 1934 to a post-graduate College. In 1942, Sir Shri Ram became the Chairman of the Governing Body of the college. By the year 1948, although comparatively young among the colleges of Delhi University, the Commercial College had the maximum enrolment possible under the university rules. The college offered B.A. Pass course and the B.A. Honours course in Commerce and M.A. courses in Economics and Commerce. In 1949, it was proposed to rename the college as “Shri Ram College of Commerce” but it took three year to implement it due to the reticence of Lala Shri Ram. Until 1949, the college was located at 8, Darya Ganj, New Delhi. In 1950, the proposal to shift the college to the University Enclave was accepted and implemented.

Shriram Institute for Industrial Research, founded in 1947 by an illustrious founder Sir Shri Ram, started functioning in 1950. Sir Shri Ram believed that if India was to catch up with the rest of the world, it was necessary to understand existing technology and innovate it through research.

Lady Shri Ram College for Women Established in 1956 in New Delhi by the late Lala Shri Ram in memory of his wife Phoolan Devi (Lady Shri Ram), the college began in a school building in Daryaganj, Central Delhi. Today, the college is located in a 5-acre (20,000 m2) campus in Lajpat Nagar in South Delhi.

Association with other Organisation:

On 16 February 1930, he had taken over from G.D. Birla as 4th President of the Federation of Indian Chambers of Commerce and Industry (FICCI) and with Mahatma Gandhi by his side, a bold gesture at that time; he had delivered his Presidential Address on 7 April 1931.

Sir Shri Ram was nominated as a member of first Central Board of Directors of Reserve Bank of India with effect from 1 January 1935.

On 2 March 1937 the Delhi Improvement Trust came into being and Sir Shri Ram became its member.

Sir Shri Ram was the member of All-India Organisation of Industrial Employers (A.O.I.E) since its inception and became the President of A.O.I.E for the year 1940 and 1941.

AWARDS AND HONOUR:

British Government in India recognized the contributions made by Sir Shriram towards the development of society and hence conferred him with a knighthood in 1941.

Death and legacy
Sir Shri Ram died in Delhi on 11 January 1963 at the age of 79.  On the death of Sir Shri Ram, Dr. S. Radhakrishnan, the then President of India said, “He was not only a great industrialist but helped many good causes. His contributions to education are memorable”.

See also
 Bharat Ram
 Charat Ram
 Sumitra Charat Ram
 Bansi Dhar

References

External links
 Lady Shri Ram College history page
 Business Standard Article
 Great Lives chapter on Sir Shri Ram
 Link on the founder of Shriram College of Commerce

Bibliography
Khushwant Singh and Arun Joshi, “Shri Ram-A Biography” (1968) Asia Publishing House, Bombay

Suggested reading
 Sir Shri Ram Biography prepared by The Shri Ram Biography Project 
 From the Brink of Bankruptcy: The DCM Story by Vinay-Bharat Ram 
 Draft of the Biography on Sir Shri Ram written by Bhupesh Bhandari 
 Lala Shri Ram: A Study in Entrepreneurship and Industrial Management by Arun Joshi 
 Shri Ram, A Biography by Khushwant Singh and Arun Joshi
 How business leaders like Shri Ram inspired workers to excel, Are unions losing influence by Dayal, I (1997) [Stable URL:   https://www.jstor.org/stable/27767528]

1884 births
1963 deaths
Businesspeople from Delhi
Indian businesspeople in textiles
Indian Knights Bachelor